Graeme Jacobs (born 6 March 1944) is a former Australian rules footballer who played with Melbourne and South Melbourne in the VFL during the 1960s.

Jacobs was member of a Melbourne premiership side in his debut season, lining up at centre half forward in the 1964 VFL Grand Final. He later struggled to make the team regularly and in 1968 crossed to South Melbourne where he played for the next three seasons.

External links
 
 

1944 births
Australian rules footballers from Victoria (Australia)
Melbourne Football Club players
Sydney Swans players
Living people
Melbourne Football Club Premiership players
One-time VFL/AFL Premiership players